Argyresthia spinosella is a moth of the family Yponomeutidae. It is found in Europe and Anatolia.

The wingspan is 9–11 mm. The head is white. Forewings are fuscous, with purple reflections, base ochreous; a thick white dorsal streak to tornus; a darker fuscous median fascia, interrupted in disc, edged with whitish on costa; some whitish costal strigulae posteriorly. Hindwings are grey. The moth flies from May to July. .

The larvae feed on Prunus spinosa.

References

Notes
The flight season refers to Belgium and The Netherlands. This may vary in other parts of the range.

External links
 waarneming.nl 
 Lepidoptera of Belgium
 Argyresthia spinosella at UK Moths

Moths described in 1849
Argyresthia
Moths of Europe
Moths of Asia